The 2005 FC Spartak Moscow season was the club's 14th season in the Russian Premier League season. Spartak finished the season in 2nd position, qualifying for the 2006–07 UEFA Champions League Second Qualifying Round. In the 2005–06 Russian Cup, Spartak progressed to the Quarterfinals of the Russian Cup which took place during the 2006 season.

Season events

Squad

On loan

Left club during season

Transfers

In

Loans in

Out

Loans out

Released

Competitions

Premier League

Results by round

Results

League table

Russian Cup

2005-06

Round of 16 took place during the 2006 season.

Squad statistics

Appearances and goals

|-
|colspan="14"|Players away from the club on loan:

|-
|colspan="14"|Players who appeared for Spartak Moscow but left during the season:

|}

Goal scorers

Clean sheets

Disciplinary record

References

FC Spartak Moscow seasons
Spartak Moscow